The MAX232 is an integrated circuit by Maxim Integrated Products, now a subsidiary of Analog Devices, that converts signals from a TIA-232 (RS-232) serial port to signals suitable for use in TTL-compatible digital logic circuits. The MAX232 is a dual transmitter / dual receiver that typically is used to convert the RX, TX, CTS, RTS signals.

The drivers provide TIA-232 voltage level outputs (about ±7.5 volts) from a single 5-volt supply by on-chip charge pumps and external capacitors. This makes it useful for implementing TIA-232 in devices that otherwise do not need any other voltages.  The receivers translates the TIA-232 input voltages (up to ±25 volts, though MAX232 supports up to ±30 volts) down to standard 5 volt TTL levels.  These receivers have a typical threshold of 1.3 volts and a typical hysteresis of 0.5 volts.

The MAX232 replaced an older pair of chips MC1488 and MC1489 that performed similar RS-232 translation. The MC1488 quad transmitter chip required 12 volt and −12 volt power, and MC1489 quad receiver chip required 5 volt power. The main disadvantages of this older solution was the ±12 volt power requirement, only supported 5 volt digital logic, and two chips instead of one.

History
The MAX232 was proposed by Charlie Allen and designed by Dave Bingham.  Maxim Integrated Products announced the MAX232 no later than 1986.

Versions
The later MAX232A is backward compatible with the original MAX232 but may operate at higher baud rates and can use smaller external capacitors 0.1 μF in place of the 1.0 μF capacitors used with the original device. The newer MAX3232 and MAX3232E are also backwards compatible, but operates at a broader voltage range, from 3 to 5.5 V.

Pin-to-pin compatible versions from other manufacturers are ICL232, SP232, ST232, ADM232 and HIN232. Texas Instruments makes compatible chips, using MAX232 as the part number.

Voltage levels

The MAX232 translates a TTL logic 0 input to between +3 and +15 V, and changes TTL logic 1 input to between −3 and −15 V, and vice versa for converting from TIA-232 to TTL. (The TIA-232 uses opposite voltages for data and control lines, see RS-232 voltage levels.)

Applications

The MAX232(A) has two receivers that convert from RS-232 to TTL voltage levels, and two drivers that convert from TTL logic to RS-232 voltage levels. As a result, only two out of all RS-232 signals can be converted in each direction. Typically, the first driver/receiver pair of the MAX232 is used for TX and RX signals, and the second one for CTS and RTS signals.

There are not enough drivers/receivers in the MAX232 to also connect the DTR, DSR, and DCD signals. Usually, these signals can be omitted when, for example, communicating with a PC's serial interface, or when special cables render them unnecessary. If the DTE requires these signals, a second MAX232 or some other IC from the MAX232 family can be used.

Derivatives
The MAX232 family was subsequently extended by Maxim to versions with four transmitters (the MAX234) and a version with four receivers and four transmitters (the MAX248), as well as several other combinations of receivers and transmitters. A notable addition is the MAX316x which is able to be electrically reconfigured between differential 5 V (RS-422 and RS-485) and single-ended RS-232 albeit at reduced voltage.

References

External links 

 MAX232 & MAX232A, Maxim
 Investigating Fake MAX3232 TTL-to-RS-232 Chips

Integrated circuits